Bisheh-e Sorkh (also Romanized as Bīsheh-e Sorkh) is a village in Sardasht Rural District, Sardasht District, Dezful County, Khuzestan Province, Iran. At the 2006 census, its population was 46, in 8 families.

References 

Populated places in Dezful County